Bybrua is a Norwegian word that means "town bridge". It may refer to:

Bybrua, Rogaland, a bridge in the city of Stavanger in Rogaland county, Norway
Bybrua, Innlandet, a village in Gjøvik municipality in Innlandet county, Norway